Pinamar – Pinepark is a resort town of the Costa de Oro in the Canelones Department of southern Uruguay.

Geography

Location
It borders Salinas to the east and the resort Neptunia to the west.

Population
In 2011 Pinamar – Pinepark had a population of 4,724.
 
Source: Instituto Nacional de Estadística de Uruguay

References

External links

INE map of Salinas, Pinemar-Pinepark, Marindia, Neptunia and Villa Juana

Populated places in the Canelones Department
Seaside resorts in Uruguay